Shirley station is an MBTA Commuter Rail station in Shirley, Massachusetts. It serves the Fitchburg Line, and is located in the village center. The station consists of a short low-level platform with an asphalt patch for passengers to cross the tracks, plus a small wooden shelter on the inbound side. Shirley station is not accessible.

History

The Fitchburg Railroad opened to Shirley on December 30, 1844. The station was located near Davis Street. Service - later operated by the Boston and Maine Railroad - lasted until the newly formed Massachusetts Bay Transportation Authority began to subsidize service in 1965. The section of the line from West Concord to Fitchburg was outside the MBTA's funding district, and service was cut back to West Concord on January 18, 1965. The mid-sized station building was torn down around this time.

The line was re-extended as far as Ayer (one stop inbound of Shirley) later in 1965 and cut back to South Acton in 1975. Service was extended out to Gardner in January 1980, but the stops at Shirley and West Acton were not restored. The bus shelter was replaced by a hip-roofed wooden structure - its style based on the original Shirley station - in 1993.

References

External links

 MBTA - Shirley
 Shirley station from Google Maps Street View

Stations along Boston and Maine Railroad lines
MBTA Commuter Rail stations in Middlesex County, Massachusetts
1844 establishments in Massachusetts
Railway stations in the United States opened in 1844